ESSA-2 (or OT-2) was a spin-stabilized operational meteorological satellite. Its name was derived from that of its oversight agency, the Environmental Science Services Administration (ESSA).

Launch 

ESSA-2 was launched on February 28, 1966, at 13:55 UTC. It was launched atop a Delta rocket from Cape Canaveral, Florida. ESSA-2 had an inclination of 101.3°, and an orbited the earth once every 113 minutes.

Mission 
ESSA-2 was a sun-synchronous polar-orbiting weather satellite whose mission was to provide real-time pictures of cloud cover using the automatic picture transmission system. These cloud cover pictures were used by meteorologists for use in weather forecasting and analysis. The satellite provided useful cloud pictures for more than 4 years before the camera systems were placed in standby mode on March 20, 1970. ESSA-2 was fully deactivated on October 16, 1970.

References 

Spacecraft launched in 1966
Weather satellites of the United States